Eta Scorpii, Latinized from η Scorpii, is a star in the southern zodiac constellation of Scorpius. With an apparent visual magnitude of 3.33, this is one of the brighter members of the Scorpius and is the furthest south of the constellation stars with a Bayer designation.

The stellar classification of this star has undergone some revision over time, with the star being classified anywhere from an F-type main sequence star to a giant star. In 2006, the NStars program assigned it a class of F5 IV, where the luminosity class of 'IV' indicates this is a subgiant star that is exhausting the supply of hydrogen at its core and is in the process of evolving into a giant star. It has around 175% of the Sun's mass with an estimated age of 1.1 billion years. The star is radiating about 18 times the luminosity of the Sun from its outer atmosphere at an effective temperature of 6,533 K. It is this heat that gives it a yellow-white hue that is typical for an F-type star.

This is causing the star to spin on its axis with a period of less than a day. In 1991 it was identified as a possible barium star, as it displays an enhanced abundance of the element barium in its spectrum. Overall, the abundance of elements other than hydrogen and helium, what astronomers term the star's metallicity, is similar to the abundance in the Sun.

References

Scorpii, Eta
Scorpius (constellation)
F-type subgiants
084143
155203
6380
0657
CD-43 11485